The 1972 United States Senate election in Texas was held on November 7, 1972. Incumbent Republican U.S. Senator John Tower won re-election to a third term.

Democratic primary

Candidates
Thomas M. Cartlidge
Barefoot Sanders, Judge of the United States District Court for the Northern District of Texas and former State Representative
Alfonso Veloz, candidate for Governor in 1968
Hugh Wilson, candidate for Senate in 1957 and 1961
Ralph Yarborough, former U.S. Senator (1957–1971)

Results

Although he received over one million votes, Yarborough was 269 short of a majority. He and Sanders advanced to a runoff election held June 3.

Runoff campaign

Republican primary

Candidates
John G. Tower, incumbent U.S. Senator since 1961

Results

References

Texas
1972
1972 Texas elections